Jan Busuttil (born 6 March 1999) is a Maltese footballer who plays as a midfielder for Floriana and the Malta national team.

Career
Busuttil made his international debut for Malta on 11 November 2020 in a friendly match against Liechtenstein.

Career statistics

International

International goals
Scores and results list Malta's goal tally first.

References

External links
 Jan Busuttil league statistics
 
 

1999 births
Living people
Maltese footballers
Malta youth international footballers
Malta under-21 international footballers
Malta international footballers
Association football midfielders
Pietà Hotspurs F.C. players
Floriana F.C. players
Maltese Premier League players